Tanzim Hasan Sakib (born 20 October 2002) is a Bangladeshi cricketer. He made his List A debut for Bangladesh Krira Shikkha Protishtan in the 2018–19 Dhaka Premier Division Cricket League on 27 March 2019. In December 2019, he was named in Bangladesh's squad for the 2020 Under-19 Cricket World Cup. He made his first-class debut on 29 March 2021, for Sylhet Division in the 2020–21 National Cricket League. He made his Twenty20 debut on 5 June 2021, for Abahani Limited in the 2021 Dhaka Premier Division Twenty20 Cricket League.

In December 2021, he was named in Bangladesh's team for the 2022 ICC Under-19 Cricket World Cup in the West Indies.

References

External links
 

2002 births
Living people
Bangladeshi cricketers
Abahani Limited cricketers
Bangladesh Krira Shikkha Protishtan cricketers
Sylhet Division cricketers
Place of birth missing (living people)